"I'm Coming Out" is a song recorded by American singer Diana Ross. It was written and produced by Chic members Bernard Edwards and Nile Rodgers, and released on August 22, 1980, as the second single from Ross' self-titled tenth album Diana (1980).

Background

In 1979, Ross commissioned Chic founders Nile Rodgers and Bernard Edwards to create material for a new album after taking her daughters to see the band in concert, following the success of Ross's final Ashford & Simpson-composed and produced LP, The Boss. In 2021, Nile Rodgers confirmed in a TikTok video that the song was originally intended for the LGBTQ community, and was inspired after seeing drag queens dressed as Diana Ross at a New York club, with him stating:

The lyrics hold an additional meaning to Ross, as she was leaving Motown Records and "coming out" from under Berry Gordy's thumb. According to the BBC4 documentary How to Make It in the Music Business, Ross loved the record until she put it in front of Frankie Crocker, who pointed out that "I'm coming out" is what homosexual people use to announce their homosexuality, that listeners would think Diana herself was announcing she was gay, and that it would ruin her career. She ran back to the studio in tears and demanded to know why Rodgers and Edwards would write the song knowing that it would damage her career, but was later convinced that was not the case and decided to release the song.

Legacy
The song was another hit from the album, peaking at number 5 on the U.S. Billboard Hot 100 chart for three weeks in November 1980. It is also notable for being the first song usually performed at Ross' performances and concerts since 1980. In 2021, it was ranked at No. 385 on Rolling Stone's "Top 500 Greatest Songs of All Time".

LGBTQ significance 
"I'm Coming Out" has been regarded as an anthem for the LGBTQ community. The phrase "coming out" to describe one's self-disclosure of sexual orientation or gender identity had been present in the LGBTQ subculture since the early 20th century. It has also been understood as "coming out of the closet" or coming out from hiding. The song is thus interpreted as a celebration of lesbian, gay, bisexual, or transgender identity and the encouragement of self-disclosure.

Trombone solo
Rodgers convinced his neighbor, producer Meco Monardo, to contract the horns for the album in return for a commitment by Rodgers to co-produce Monardo's then-upcoming album of music from The Empire Strikes Back. Monardo, a former first-call session player who had a string of hits in the late 1970s with disco versions of film music, also played trombone on the album and is featured in a solo towards the end of "I'm Coming Out":

Trombone solos have been rare on Top 40 songs in the post-big band era and especially so since the 1960s. Notable exceptions include brief solos by James Pankow on a handful of early Chicago hits and Clifford Adams' brief solo on Kool & the Gang's 1983 hit "Joanna".

The dispute with Ross led to none of the musicians being credited on the album cover and also may have had a part in Rodgers backing out of his commitment to Monardo's Meco Plays Music from The Empire Strikes Back album. However, Rodgers and Monardo later mended their professional relationship and subsequent digital releases of the album credit Monardo and the other musicians. A 2003 two-disc release of the album included the Rodgers/Edwards mix originally rejected by Ross, as a bonus track.

Music video

The video consists of Ross performing the song with studio musicians live in concert.

Track listings
U.S., UK, French, and German 7-inch and 12-inch single
Side A:
"I'm Coming Out"
Side B:
"Give Up"

Dutch 7-inch and 12-inch single
Side A:
"I'm Coming Out"
Side B:
"Never Say I Don't Love You"

Swedish 7-inch single
Side A:
"I'm Coming Out"
Side B:
"My Old Piano"

Chart performance

Weekly charts

Year-end charts

Certifications

Amerie version

In 2003, American singer Amerie covered "I'm Coming Out" for the soundtrack to the film Maid in Manhattan. Her version was released as a single in select European countries and Australia. The final single version to be released was the Loren Dawson remix. The original single version (which is similar to the original) can be found on both CD singles and the original motion picture soundtrack to Maid in Manhattan. Ross' version appears on the film's soundtrack album as well.

Music video
A music video was produced to promote the single.

Track listings
German CD single
"I'm Coming Out" (Loren Dawson Remix) – 3:49
"Talkin' to Me" (album version) – 4:00
"Talkin' to Me" (Trackmasters Remix) (featuring Foxy Brown) – 3:38
"Talkin’ to Me" (Mark Ronson Sunshine Remix) (no loop) – 3:09
"I'm Coming Out" (video)

French CD single
"I'm Coming Out" (Loren Dawson Remix) – 3:49
"Talkin' to Me" (album version) – 4:00

Australian CD single
"I'm Coming Out" (Loren Dawson Remix) – 3:49
"Talkin' to Me" (album version) – 4:00
"Talkin' to Me" (Trackmasters Remix) (featuring Foxy Brown) – 3:38

Charts

Release history

Other samples and covers
The distinctive sound of "I'm Coming Out" and its resulting popularity has led to Ross's song often being sampled, most notably by Stevie J, who sampled the song for rapper The Notorious B.I.G.'s 1997 song "Mo Money Mo Problems" with Mase, Sean "Diddy" Combs and Kelly Price. Ross and Combs performed "I'm Coming Out / Mo Money Mo Problems" in 2019 as a mashup at Ross's 75th birthday party at the Hollywood Palladium.
In 1997, German comedian Hella von Sinnen sampled "I'm Coming Out" for her single "Mein Coming Out", using the term "coming out" in the context of coming out of the closet, or revealing one's homosexuality.

References

1980 singles
1997 singles
2003 singles
Amerie songs
Diana Ross songs
LGBT-related songs
Songs written by Bernard Edwards
Songs written by Nile Rodgers
Song recordings produced by Nile Rodgers
Song recordings produced by Bernard Edwards
Songs with feminist themes
1980 songs
Motown singles
Columbia Records singles